This is a list of members of the Swedish Academy by seat number. The dates shown indicate the terms of the members, who generally serve for life except for Gustaf Mauritz Armfelt who was excluded twice.

On 2 May 2018, the Swedish King amended the rules of the academy and made it possible for members to resign. The new rules also states that a member who has been inactive in the work of the academy for more than two years, can be asked to resign. Following the new rules, the first members to formally be granted permission to leave the Academy and vacating their chairs were Kerstin Ekman, Klas Östergren, Sara Stridsberg and Lotta Lotass.

Seat 1

Seat 2

Seat 3

Seat 4

Seat 5

Seat 6

Seat 7

Seat 8

Seat 9

Seat 10

Seat 11

Seat 12

Seat 13

Seat 14

Seat 15

Seat 16

Seat 17

Seat 18

References

External links
 Members of the Swedish Academy at Projekt Runeberg – in Swedish

 
 
Swedish Academy
Academy Members